Yorito is a municipality in the department of Yoro, Honduras.

Demographics
At the time of the 2013 Honduras census, Yorito municipality had a population of 18,823. Of these, 83.08% were Mestizo, 14.54% Indigenous (13.43% Tolupan), 2.04% White, 0.32% Black or Afro-Honduran and 0.01% others.

References

Municipalities of the Yoro Department